is a passenger railway station in the city of Hashimoto, Wakayama Prefecture, Japan, operated by the private railway company Nankai Electric Railway.

Lines
Kamuro Station is served by the Nankai Kōya Line, and is located 50.4 kilometers from the terminus of the line at Shiomibashi Station and 49.7 kilometers from Namba Station.

Station layout
The station consists of two opposed side platforms connected to the station building by a level crossing. The station is unattended.

Platforms

Adjacent stations

History
Kamuro Station opened on November 1, 1924. The Nankai Railway was merged into the Kintetsu group in 1944 by orders of the Japanese government, and reemerged as the Nankai Railway Company in 1947.

Passenger statistics
In fiscal 2019, the station was used by an average of 436 passengers daily (boarding passengers only).

Surrounding area
 Kamuro Tenmangu
 Kamuro Daishi
 Hashimoto City Kamuro Elementary School

See also
List of railway stations in Japan

References

External links

 Kamuro Station Official Site

Railway stations in Japan opened in 1924
Railway stations in Wakayama Prefecture
Hashimoto, Wakayama